A unit load device (ULD) is a container used to load luggage, freight, and mail on wide-body aircraft and specific narrow-body aircraft. It allows preloading of cargo, confidence the containerised load will fit in the aircraft and efficient planning of aircraft weight and balance and reduced labour and time in loading aircraft holds compared with 'bulk-loading' single items of cargo or luggage by hand. Each ULD has its own packing list or manifest so that its contents can be tracked. A loaded aircraft cargo pallet secured with a cargo net also forms a ULD, but its load must be gauged for size in addition to being weighed to ensure aircraft door and hold clearances.

The IATA publishes ULD regulations and notes there are 900,000 in service worth more than US$1 billion, averaging $ each.

Types
ULDs come in two forms: pallets and containers. ULD pallets are rugged sheets of aluminium with rims designed to lock onto cargo net lugs. ULD containers, also known as cans and pods, are closed containers made of aluminium or a combination of aluminium (frame) and Lexan (walls), which, depending on the nature of the goods to be transported, may have built-in refrigeration units. Examples of common ULDs and their specifics are listed below.

 Notes

Aircraft compatibility

LD3s, LD6s, and LD11s will fit 787s, 777s, 747s, MD-11s, Il-86s, Il-96s, L-1011s and all Airbus wide-bodies. The 767 uses the smaller LD2s and LD8s because of its narrower fuselage. The less common LD1 is designed specifically for the 747, but LD3s are more commonly used in its place because of ubiquity (they have the same floor dimensions such that one LD3 takes the place of one LD1). LD3s with reduced height ( instead of ) can also be loaded on the Airbus A320 family. LD7 pallets will fit 787s, 777s, 747s, late model 767s (with larger doors), and Airbus wide-bodies.

Interchangeability of certain ULDs between LD3/6/11 aircraft and LD2/8 aircraft is possible when cargo needs to be quickly transferred to a connecting flight. Both LD2s and LD8s can be loaded in LD3/6/11 aircraft, but at the cost of using internal volume inefficiently (33 ft3 wasted per LD2). Only the LD3 of the LD3/6/11 family of ULDs can be loaded in a 767; it will occupy an entire row where two LD2s or one LD8 would otherwise have fit (90 ft3 wasted per LD3). Policies vary from airline to airline as to whether such transfers are allowed.

The 787, intended to replace the 767, was designed to use the LD3/6/11 family of ULDs to solve the wasted volume issue.

ULD capacity

Aircraft loads can consist of containers, pallets, or a mix of ULD types, depending on requirements. In some aircraft the two types must be mixed as some compartments take only specific ULDs.

Container capacity of an aircraft is measured in positions. Each half-width container (LD1/LD2/LD3) in the aircraft it was designed for occupies one position. Typically, each row in a cargo compartment consists of two positions. Therefore, a full-width container (LD6/LD8/LD11) will take two positions. An LD6 or an LD11 can occupy the space of two LD3s. An LD8 takes the space of two LD2s.

Aircraft pallet capacity is measured by how many PMC-type LD7s  can be stored. These pallets occupy approximately three LD3 positions (two positions of one row and half of the two positions of the following row) or four LD2 positions. PMCs can only be loaded in cargo compartments with large doors designed to accept them (small door compartments are container-only).

Identification

All ULDs are identified by their ULD number. A three-letter prefix identifies its type and key characteristics, followed by a 4 or 5 digit serial number (4 if prior to October 1, 1993; either 4 or 5 if after October 1, 1993) to uniquely identify it from others of the same type, and ending with a two character (alpha-numerical) suffix identifying the ULD's owner (if an airline, often the same as IATA designator codes). For example, AKN 12345 DL means that the ULD is a forkliftable LD3 with the unique number 12345 and its owner is Delta Air Lines.

 Notes

Common prefixes

AAF: LD26 container
AAP: LD9
AAU: LD29 container
AGA: M2 container
AKC: LD1 without forklift holes
AKE: LD3 without forklift holes/half ALF
AKN: LD3 with forklift holes
ALB: LD4 with forklift holes
ALD: LD11 container (aka L11)
ALF: LD6 without forklift holes
ALP: LD11 without forklift holes
ALP: LD4 without forklift holes
AMA: M1 container
AMD: M1H container
AMU: LD39 container contour similar to ALF, but deeper and bigger extensions. biggest lower-deck container
AVY: LD1 with forklift holes
AWC: LD6 with forklift holes
AYY: Demi, a half-width contoured container typically used for the main deck
AYX: AYY with fittings to connect a fire extinguisher so as to carry Dangerous Goods
DPE: LD2 without forklift holes
DPN: LD2 with forklift holes
DQF: LD8 with forklift holes
FLA: LD11 pallet
FQA: LD8 pallet (same floor dimensions as DQF)
HMA: Horse stall
KMA: Sheep and goat pen
P1P: LD7, large pallet, folding wings for overhang
PAD: LD7, large pallet, flat
PGA: M6, large pallet, freighter main deck only
PLA: LD11 pallet
PMC: LD7, large pallet
QKE: LD3 same as AKE but made of KEVLAR and designed to be bombproof. No forklift holes.
RAP: LD9 with refrigeration unit
RAU: LD29 container with refrigeration unit
RKN: LD3 with refrigeration unit
RWB: LD11 with refrigeration unit
SAA: Full-sized version of the AYY
SAX: Full-sized version of the AYX
VRA: M6, large pallet, twin car rack
XAW: LD7, large pallet, fixed wings for overhang
XKC: LD3 without forklift holes/half ALF

Main-deck ULDs

What the actual dimensions of contoured upper deck ULDs are is very hard to know, because most manufacturers only profile width, length and height data.

There are several common types of contoured main deck ULDs, that are contoured (curved to fit in the plane's body) to provide as much cargo volume as possible. Initially ULD contouring was simply a triangle removed from one or two corners of the profile of the ULD, such as the common LD3 and LD6. Main deck ULDs use curves for the contoured shape to truly maximize cargo volume. Upper deck ULDs are just like lower deck ULDs that are either the full width of the plane with two corners of the profile removed (lower deck LD6 lower), or that container is cut in half, down the center line of the plane, (lower deck LD3 and upper deck AAX).

Main deck ULDs and pallets are not only taller than lower deck ULDs, they are frequently two or four times longer. They are usually organized like an LD6, using the width of the plane and missing two profile corners, or two very long LD3s, stored in parallel to use the plane's width and each missing one profile corner, but often twice or four times as long from plane's nose to tail.

Many air cargo companies use main deck ULDs that have both features called dual-profile, so that on smaller planes such as the Boeing 727, they are stored widthwise and have two corners contoured, and on the bigger Boeing 767, they can be rotated 90 degrees and shipped in parallel like LD3s, so that only one corner is contoured when being used like an LD3. This greatly simplifies transportation of cargo containers at slight cost of cargo volume.

See also

 463L master pallet, used for military aircraft transport and airdrops
 AAR Corp, parent company of Nordisk Aviation, a manufacturer of ULDs
 Containerization
 Intermodal container
 Pallet
 Rio Tinto Alcan, formerly Alusuisse, a manufacturer of ULDs
 Shipping container
 Unit load

References

External links 

 

Civil aviation
Shipping containers
Air freight